Cine Rialto was one of the most historic theaters cinemas in Barquisimeto, capital of Lara state, in western center of Venezuela.

It worked almost continuously for 70 years. For several years he was there as one of the best cinemas in the city specializing in the screening of the latest Hollywood releases in best quality also stands out for being the only film that did not close permanently with the advent of multiplexes of shopping centers.

References

Cinemas in Venezuela
Buildings and structures in Barquisimeto